WBBC-FM is a Country formatted broadcast radio station licensed to Blackstone, Virginia, serving Southside Virginia.  WBBC-FM is owned and operated by Denbar Communications, Inc.

References

External links
 Bobcat Country 93.5 FM Online
 

1975 establishments in Virginia
Country radio stations in the United States
Radio stations established in 1975
BBC-FM